The 2022 Australian Open (officially known as the Sathio Group Australian Open 2022 for sponsorship reasons) was a badminton tournament which took place at the State Sports Centre in Sydney, Australia, from 15 to 20 November 2022 and had a total prize of US$180,000.

Tournament
The 2022 Australian Open was the twentieth and final tournament in the 2022 BWF World Tour prior to the World Tour Finals. It was a part of the Australian Open, which had been held since 1975. This tournament was organized by Badminton Australia with sanction from the BWF.

Venue
This international tournament was held at the State Sports Centre in Sydney, Australia.

Point distribution
Below is the point distribution table for each phase of the tournament based on the BWF points system for the BWF World Tour Super 300 event.

Prize money 
The total prize money for this tournament was US$180,000. The distribution of the prize money was in accordance with BWF regulations.

Men's singles

Seeds 

 Lee Zii Jia (second round)
 Loh Kean Yew (quarter-finals)
 Anthony Sinisuka Ginting (withdrew)
 Jonatan Christie (withdrew)
 Lakshya Sen (withdrew)
 Kunlavut Vitidsarn (withdrew)
 Srikanth Kidambi (withdrew)
 Kanta Tsuneyama (first round)

Wild card 
Badminton Australia awarded a wild card entry to Nathan Tang.

Finals

Top half

Section 1

Section 2

Bottom half

Section 3

Section 4

Women's singles

Seeds 

 An Se-young (champion)
 Ratchanok Intanon (withdrew)
 Pornpawee Chochuwong (semi-finals)
 Nozomi Okuhara (quarter-finals)
 Busanan Ongbamrungphan (withdrew)
 Lalinrat Chaiwan (withdrew)
 Han Yue (semi-finals)
 Yeo Jia Min (first round)

Wild card 
Badminton Australia awarded a wild card entry to Chen Hsuan-yu.

Finals

Top half

Section 1

Section 2

Bottom half

Section 3

Section 4

Men's doubles

Seeds 

 Takuro Hoki / Yugo Kobayashi (withdrew)
 Lee Yang / Wang Chi-lin (quarter-finals)
 Mohammad Ahsan / Hendra Setiawan (withdrew)
 Fajar Alfian / Muhammad Rian Ardianto (withdrew)
 Satwiksairaj Rankireddy / Chirag Shetty (withdrew)
 Ong Yew Sin / Teo Ee Yi (final)
 Liang Weikeng / Wang Chang (quarter-finals)
 Liu Yuchen / Ou Xuanyi (champions)

Finals

Top half

Section 1

Section 2

Bottom half

Section 3

Section 4

Women's doubles

Seeds 

 Nami Matsuyama / Chiharu Shida (second round)
 Mayu Matsumoto / Wakana Nagahara (quarter-finals)
 Yuki Fukushima / Sayaka Hirota (quarter-finals)
 Jongkolphan Kititharakul / Rawinda Prajongjai (withdrew) 
 Jeong Na-eun / Kim Hye-jeong (semi-finals)
 Zhang Shuxian / Zheng Yu (champions)
 Rin Iwanaga / Kie Nakanishi (second round)
 Baek Ha-na / Lee Yu-lim (withdrew)

Finals

Top half

Section 1

Section 2

Bottom half

Section 3

Section 4

Mixed doubles

Seeds 

 Yuta Watanabe / Arisa Higashino (withdrew)
 Mathias Christiansen / Alexandra Bøje (withdrew)
 Tan Kian Meng / Lai Pei Jing (withdrew)
 Seo Seung-jae / Chae Yoo-jung (champions)
 Goh Soon Huat / Shevon Jemie Lai (withdrew)
 Rinov Rivaldy / Pitha Haningtyas Mentari (withdrew)
 Yuki Kaneko / Misaki Matsutomo (quarter-finals)
 Feng Yanzhe / Huang Dongping (semi-finals)

Wild card 
Badminton Australia awarded a wild card entry to Lim Ming Chuen / Sylvina Kurniawan.

Finals

Top half

Section 1

Section 2

Bottom half

Section 3

Section 4

References

External links 
Tournament link

Australian Open (badminton)
Australian Open
Australian Open
Australian Open